CNAF Stadium is a football stadium in Romania. The ground is part of the Football Centre in Buftea and has a double stand with views to each of its two fields. It can hold 800 people on each side. The complex is the second training centre of the Romanian Football Federation.

The Buftea Stadium staged three group matches at the 2011 UEFA European Under-19 Championship.

References 
 

Football venues in Romania